The Einang Sound is a small sound in the middle of Slidre Fjord in Oppland county, Norway, about  wide. It is crossed by Norwegian County Road 261 via the Einang Sound Bridge, which was built in 1963. Before that, a cable ferry operated at the site. The ferry was important for moving people and animals across the sound to and from farms. The cable was anchored to two concrete pillars, both of which are still standing. The ferry, the cable, and various accessories are now on display at the Valdres Folk Museum in Fagernes. The Einang stone stands just to the east, above the sound.

References

Vestre Slidre